Shaurya Doval is an Indian founder and leader of a right-wing think tank, India Foundation that is closely associated with the Narendra Modi Government. He’s an alumnus of London Business School and Booth School of Business, University of Chicago. He has worked as investment banker for GE Capital and Morgan Stanley and heads Torch Investment (previously known as Zeus Caps). 

Doval and his organisation have attracted scrutiny by left leaning news portals due to their alleged growing influence, opaque funding and ties to some of India cabinet ministers. Doval filed a criminal defamation case against Caravan portal and Jairam Ramesh for 'deliberately defaming him “seemingly to settle scores” with his father. In December 2020, Ramesh apologised in court for "any hurt the statements may have caused".

Early life and education 
Shaurya is the son of Ajit Doval, India's National Security Advisor. He completed his school education from the Army Public School. He holds a BA degree in Economics from Hindu College of Delhi University with honors. 

He also holds two MBA degrees from Booth School of Business, University of Chicago and London Business School. Additionally, he has a CA degree from ICAI.

Career 
Doval is an investment banker by profession who serves as the managing director of a Singapore-based wealth management firm, Torch Investment (previously known as Zeus Caps), a company chaired by Saudi Prince Mishaal bin Abdullah Al Saud. 

He has over 20 years of international investment banking experience, during which he has worked for over a decade in London in leveraged finance at GE Capital's London office and the investment banking division of Morgan Stanley. He has also worked with corporate finance advisory at Arthur Andersen in India. 

He was awarded the Eisenhower Fellowship in 2015 for his work in the field of Public Policy.

Politics 
In 2014, Doval was a planner for the $1.5m public reception for the newly appointed Prime Minister of India Narendra Modi by the Indian American community at Madison Square Garden during his 2014 state visit to the US which was attended by 20,000 people.

He formally joined Bharatiya Janta Party in Uttarakhand as a special invitee in the party's state executive members' meet in 2017. He became the party's convenor for good governance in the state. Political analysts speculated that he might contest the 2019 Indian general election from the Pauri Garhwal seat of Uttarakhand. In April 2019, Z security protection was provided in response to potential security threats against him and his father during the elections.

According to a 2017 report by The Wire, since 2014 Doval's think tank had become the most influential in India. It alleged that he had a conflict of interest as four of the directors of India Foundation were appointed as ministers in 2014 including Defence Minister Nirmala Sitharaman and they continued to be Directors in India Foundation even after joining the government. It questioned the Foundation's opaque sources of funding. Doval claimed that it raised money through "conferences, advertisement[s], [and] journal[s]" and that "no foreign funding has ever been received", however The Wire noted its conferences were sponsored by international companies such as Boeing and DBS Bank.

In 2019, The Caravan alleged inexplicable ties between the businesses of Doval and his younger brother Vivek who allegedly ran a hedge fund based in the Cayman Islands. This was taken up by Congress leader Jairam Ramesh in a press conference on January 17, 2019.

A subsequent criminal defamation case was filed by Vivek Doval against Ramesh, Caravan magazine and its staff writer who Doval claimed had used "inferences and innuendos" to give the impression that he and his family were involved in money laundering and round tripping. In December 2020, Jairam Ramesh apologised in court for "any hurt the statements may have caused".

Public work in Uttarakhand 
Doval conceptualized 'Bemisaal Garhwal' under the banner of 'Buland Uttarakhand' which aims to improve the quality of education and health in Uttarakhand.

Awards 
Doval was awarded the Udyog Rattan Award in 2012 for his contribution to the power sector in India. He was also the Eisenhower Fellow from India for 2015. On 13 February 2021, Chandigarh University awarded Doval with its Pride of India award 'for his contribution as think-tank and youth icon for entrepreneurs'.

See also 
 Think tank#India
 List of think tanks in India

References 

Indian accountants
Bharatiya Janata Party politicians from Uttarakhand
Year of birth missing (living people)
Living people
People from Uttarakhand
Eisenhower Fellows
Morgan Stanley employees
University of Chicago Booth School of Business alumni